Rusk is an unincorporated community in Lost River Township, Martin County, in the U.S. state of Indiana.

History
Rusk was first settled in 1836, and was likely named after Jeremiah M. Rusk, a former U.S. Secretary of Agriculture. A post office was established at Rusk in 1892, and remained in operation until it was discontinued in 1954.

Geography

References

Unincorporated communities in Martin County, Indiana
Unincorporated communities in Indiana